The South Carolina Little Three (known as the South Carolina Little Four from 1946 to 1951) was an intercollegiate athletic conference that existed from 1946 to 1964. The conference's three main members, Newberry College, Presbyterian College, and Wofford College, were located in the state of South Carolina. All three teams now play in different leagues: Newberry in the South Atlantic (Division II), Presbyterian in the Big South (FCS), and Wofford in the SoCon (FCS). Erskine College was also a member from 1946 to 1951 when it dropped its football program. Erskine has announced that their football program is returning for the 2020 season. The College of Charleston was also a member of the South Carolina Little Five in basketball, now playing in the Colonial Athletic Association, but the post-season basketball tournament was always for the South Carolina Little Four and the College of Charleston was not invited.

Members
The following is an incomplete list of the membership of the South Carolina Little Four Conference.

Football champions

1946 – Presbyterian
1947 – Presbyterian and Newberry
1948 – Wofford
1949 – Wofford
1950 – Wofford
1951 – Wofford
1952 – Wofford

1953 – Newberry and Presbyterian
1954 – Wofford
1955 – Newberry
1956 – Wofford
1957 – Wofford
1958 – Presbyterian

1959 – Presbyterian
1960 – Presbyterian
1961 – Wofford
1962 – Newberry, Presbyterian, and Wofford
1963 – Wofford
1964 – Wofford

Basketball champions

† = Qualified to the NAIA Men's Basketball Championships

See also
List of defunct college football conferences
South Atlantic Conference
Conference Carolinas
Southern Conference
Big South Conference
Colonial Athletic Association

References

Defunct college sports conferences in the United States
College sports in South Carolina